Bad Karlshafen is a railway station located in Bad Karlshafen, Germany. The station is located on the Sollingbahn. The train services are operated by NordWestBahn. The station is close to the borders of three states: Hesse, North Rhine-Westphalia and Lower Saxony.

A former station to the south of the river existed until 1966 on the Carlsbahn.

Train services
The station is served by the following services:

Local services  Ottbergen – Bad Karlshafen – Bodenfelde – Göttingen

References

External links
Bad Karlshafen in the 1980s

Railway stations in Hesse
Buildings and structures in Kassel (district)